Kuybyshevsky District is the name of several administrative and municipal districts in Russia. The districts are generally named for Valerian Kuybyshev, a Soviet statesman.

Districts of the federal subjects
Kuybyshevsky District, Kaluga Oblast, an administrative and municipal district of Kaluga Oblast
Kuybyshevsky District, Novosibirsk Oblast, an administrative and municipal district of Novosibirsk Oblast
Kuybyshevsky District, Rostov Oblast, an administrative and municipal district of Rostov Oblast

City divisions
Kuybyshevsky City District, Irkutsk, a city district of Irkutsk, the administrative center of Irkutsk Oblast
Kuybyshevsky City District, Novokuznetsk, a city district of Novokuznetsk, a city in Kemerovo Oblast
Kuybyshevsky City District, Samara, an administrative and municipal city district of Samara, the administrative center of Samara Oblast

Renamed districts
Kuybyshevsky District, name of Spassky District of the Republic of Tatarstan, in 1935–1991

Historical districts
Kuybyshevsky District, Saint Petersburg, a former district of the federal city of St. Petersburg merged into newly created Tsentralny District in March 1994

See also
Kuybyshevsky (disambiguation)
Kuybyshev (disambiguation)

References